Porter Louis Meriwether (March 16, 1940 – November 13, 2009) was an American professional basketball player. He played in the National Basketball Association (NBA) for the Syracuse Nationals after a collegiate career at Tennessee State University. Meriwether scored 119 points in his NBA career.  He was drafted by the Hawaii Chiefs of the ABL, but chose to sign with the Nationals in the more established NBA.

From 1963-1969, Meriwether played with the Chicago Bombers. Beginning in 1964-1965, he led the  North American Basketball League in scoring for three consecutive seasons, averaging 28.1, 28.3 and 29.9 points.

Following his basketball career, he was employed by the Cook County (Illinois) Public Defender Office.

References

1940 births
2009 deaths
American men's basketball players
Basketball players from Indiana
Hamden Bics players
New Haven Elms players
Point guards
Sportspeople from Evansville, Indiana
Syracuse Nationals draft picks
Syracuse Nationals players
Tennessee State Tigers basketball players